Kun Shan University (KSU) is a private university in Yongkang District, Tainan, Taiwan. KSU is accredited by ACCSB.

KSU offers undergraduate and graduate programs in a variety of fields, including engineering, business, design, health sciences, and humanities.  

The university is known for its strong engineering programs and has partnerships with companies such as Taiwan Semiconductor Manufacturing Company (TSMC) and ASE Technology Holding.

History
KSU was founded as Kun Shan Institute of Technology on 29 April 1965. In August 2000, the school was promoted to Kun Shan University.

Faculties
 College of Applied Human Ecology
 College of Business and Management
 College of Creative Media
 College of Engineering
 College of International Study

Transportation
The university is accessible East from Tainan Station of Taiwan Railways.

See also
 List of universities in Taiwan

References

External links

 

1965 establishments in Taiwan
Educational institutions established in 1965
Technical universities and colleges in Taiwan
Universities and colleges in Tainan
Universities and colleges in Taiwan
Yongkang District